The 1910 VPI football team represented Virginia Agricultural and Mechanical College and Polytechnic Institute in the 1910 college football season. The team was led by their head coach Branch Bocock and finished with a record of six wins and two losses (6–2).

Schedule

Players
The following players were members of the 1910 football team according to the roster published in the 1911 edition of The Bugle, the Virginia Tech yearbook.

References

VPI
Virginia Tech Hokies football seasons
VPI football